CKYC-FM is a Canadian radio station, broadcasting at 93.7 FM in Owen Sound, Ontario. The station airs a country format branded as Country 93, primarily for Grey-Bruce Counties but also serving northern parts of Huron and Wellington Counties. The station is known for its active support of local country music, as well as bringing national and international country music acts to Grey and Bruce counties. CKYC was a former callsign of a radio station in Toronto, which is known today as CHKT.

History
On March 19, 2001, Bayshore Broadcasting (the owners of CFOS and CIXK-FM) received CRTC approval to operate a new FM radio station to serve Owen Sound on the frequency 93.7 MHz. The new station would broadcast a country format. The station was launched on September 4, 2001.

On September 30, 2010, CKYC-FM and sister station CIXK-FM received CRTC approval to change their authorized contours.

References

External links
Country 93
 
 

Kyc
Kyc
Radio stations established in 2001
2001 establishments in Ontario